Ádám Tóth (born 8 September 1998) is a Hungarian handball player for Dabas KK and the Hungarian national team.

He represented Hungary at the 2020 European Men's Handball Championship.

References

Hungarian male handball players
Living people
1995 births
Sportspeople from Miskolc